Lubsza  is a village in Brzeg County, Opole Voivodeship, in south-western Poland. It is the seat of the gmina (administrative district) called Gmina Lubsza.

References

Lubsza